is a railway station in Mine, Yamaguchi Prefecture, Japan.

Lines 
West Japan Railway Company
Mine Line

Surroundings 
 Chūgoku Expressway Mine-Nishi I.C.
 Mazda Mine Proving Ground (former Nishinihon Circuit)

References

Railway stations in Japan opened in 1905
Railway stations in Yamaguchi Prefecture